DYES (102.7 FM), broadcasting as 102.7 Easy Rock, is a radio station owned and operated by Manila Broadcasting Company through its licensee Pacific Broadcasting System. The station's studio and transmitter are located at Eggling Subd., Busay Hills, Cebu City. It operates daily from 5:00 am to 12:00 mn.

History
DYES was established on December 18, 1995, as a relay station of Manila-based Showbiz Tsismis under the call letters DYTO. On May 1, 2000, the station was rebranded as 102.7 Yes FM, adopted a mass-based format and changed its call letters to DYES. It transferred to Cinco Centrum Bldg. along Fuente Osmeña. Initially automated, in 2006, it began having its own set of DJs. At the same time, it moved to its current home in Eggling Subd. It went off the air sometime in 2008. On July 1, 2009, the station returned on air as 102.7 Easy Rock and switched to a Soft AC format, competing with WRocK.

On November 15, 2021, Easy Rock along with sister stations launched their new logos and its new corporate slogan, Sama-Sama Tayo, Pilipino! (lit. We are all Filipino!).

At the evening of December 16, 2021, the station went off the air after its studio and transmitter in Eggling Subdivision were destroyed by Typhoon Odette. In January 2022, it went back on the air.

References

Pacific Broadcasting Systems stations
Radio stations in Metro Cebu
Adult contemporary radio stations in the Philippines
Radio stations established in 1995
Easy Rock Network stations